Lissodrillia vitrea is a species of sea snail, a marine gastropod mollusc in the family Drilliidae.

Description
The length of the shell attains 4.2 mm.

Distribution
This species occurs in the Atlantic Ocean off the Bahamas.

References

 Fallon P.J. (2016). Taxonomic review of tropical western Atlantic shallow water Drilliidae (Mollusca: Gastropoda: Conoidea) including descriptions of 100 new species. Zootaxa. 4090(1): 1–363

External links
 

vitrea
Gastropods described in 2016